Francesco De Vito (born 10 August 1975) is an Italian actor. He played Saint Peter in The Passion of the Christ.

In 2019, he starred in the television series Heirs of the Night.

References

External links
 

1975 births
Living people
People from Taranto
Italian male film actors
Italian male television actors